Long Service Medal could mean:
 Army Long Service and Good Conduct Medal of the British Army
 Army Long Service and Good Conduct Medal (Cape of Good Hope)
 Army Long Service and Good Conduct Medal (Natal)
 Long Service Medal (Military) (Singapore) of the Singapore Armed Forces
 Medal for Long Service and Good Conduct (Military) of the British Army
 Medal for Long Service and Good Conduct (South Africa)
 Naval Long Service and Good Conduct Medal (1830) of the Royal Navy and Royal Marines
 Naval Long Service and Good Conduct Medal (1848) of the Royal Navy and Royal Marines
 Royal Air Force Long Service and Good Conduct Medal of the Royal Air Force
 Wehrmacht Long Service Award